Morappur is a legislative assembly constituency, that includes the city, Morappur. It is part of the Dharmapuri (Lok Sabha constituency).

Members of the Legislative Assembly

Merged into the newly formed Pappireddippatti State Assembly Constituency after constituency delimitation post 2008.

Election results

2006

2001

1996

1991

1989

1984

1980

1977

References

External links
 

Former assembly constituencies of Tamil Nadu